St. Mary's Catholic Church is a historic Catholic parish church in the city of Delaware, Ohio, United States.  Constructed in the 1880s, this grand building is home to a congregation established in the middle of the nineteenth century.  Its grand style has long made it a community landmark, and it was named a historic landmark in 1980.

Parish history
Delaware's first Masses were celebrated by travelling priests in the homes of the city's few Catholics, most of whom were Irish or German immigrants.  The members built the first St. Mary's Church in 1850, but six years passed before Archbishop Purcell appointed the first priest to serve as the pastor.  This man, Casper Wiese, quickly founded a parish school and bought a piece of land for use as a parish cemetery.  A series of short-tenured pastorates followed Wiese's four-year time; the longest, that of Henry Fehlings, ended during the process of regional reorganization following the creation of the Diocese of Columbus.  Fehlings' pastorate saw the parish expand outward from its small frame building: a brick addition to the church was constructed in 1865, a nearby store was purchased and converted into premises for the parish school, and a nearby house was purchased and converted into a rectory.  By 1880, the parish had reached a membership of approximately seven hundred.  In 1886, the present house of worship was constructed on William Street near downtown.

Today, St. Mary's remains an active component of the Diocese of Columbus.  It is one of three parishes in Delaware County, along with St. Joan of Arc in Powell and St. John Neumann in Sunbury.

Architecture

St. Mary's is a brick structure supported on a foundation of limestone and covered with a slate roof.  Designed by Adolphus Druiding, the building is a Gothic Revival structure dominated by a pair of towers on the facade.  The towers sit on either side of the gabled main portion of the building; the tower on the right, as seen by a person facing the building, is substantially taller than the tower on the left.  Six ogive windows pierce the side, one per bay, while individual and paired windows are placed on various heights in the towers; clocks are set in the taller tower, and both are topped with tall spires that can be seen throughout Delaware.  Extensive and ornate detailing is present, including numerous wood carvings, elaborate stained glass in the windows, and decorative placement of bricks.  Inside, columns separate the nave from the side aisles, and the two altars are built of wood that has been both painted and carven.  The extensive artisanship of the church makes it differ greatly from the rectory; although three stories tall and built of brick, it is far plainer than the church.

Historic site
In 1980, St. Mary's Church and its rectory were listed together on the National Register of Historic Places, qualifying because of their historically significant architecture.  They together comprise one of seventeen National Register-listed locations in the city of Delaware, along with places such as the Delaware County Courthouse downtown and Selby Field on the Ohio Wesleyan University campus.

References

External links

 Church website

Roman Catholic churches completed in 1886
19th-century Roman Catholic church buildings in the United States
Buildings and structures in Delaware, Ohio
National Register of Historic Places in Delaware County, Ohio
Churches in the Roman Catholic Diocese of Columbus
German-American culture in Ohio
Gothic Revival church buildings in Ohio
Irish-American culture in Ohio
Churches on the National Register of Historic Places in Ohio
U.S. Route 36
Tourist attractions in Delaware County, Ohio